Colnbrook railway station was a station on the now closed railway line between West Drayton and Staines West, on the western edge of London, England. It opened in 1884 to serve the village of Colnbrook, perhaps anticipating that one day it would grow into a larger settlement. It was located on the original route of the Great Bath Road, and under the present flight path near the end of one of Heathrow Airport's main runways.

Although passenger traffic was fairly minimal, the station was not closed to passengers until 1965 (following the Beeching Report).  Goods services were withdrawn the following year, but part of the line still remains in use for aggregates traffic and for deliveries to a fuel terminal serving the nearby Heathrow Airport.  The platforms survived for quite a while after closure, but have now been demolished.  The station house still stands, but the track beyond the former station level crossing towards Poyle has been lifted.

Part of the route may be reused for the proposed Heathrow Airtrack link between Staines and Heathrow Airport.  Between 1961 and 1965, the small  was opened to the north to serve the industrial estate there.

References 

Disused railway stations in Berkshire
Former Great Western Railway stations
Railway stations in Great Britain opened in 1884
Railway stations in Great Britain closed in 1965
Beeching closures in England